Ticket Liquidator is an online marketplace for live entertainment tickets. It is a division of Ticket Software LLC (also known as TicketNetwork), a technology company based in South Windsor, Connecticut.

Operations
Ticket Liquidator functions under a model similar to eBay; independent sellers list their tickets on the marketplace where consumers can buy them. Buyers are charged the price of the tickets (set by the seller), a service fee (assessed by Ticket Liquidator), and a delivery fee. When the tickets are available, the seller ships them directly to the buyer. The site lists tickets for many different kinds of events, including concerts and sporting competitions, mostly from professional resale brokers, and offers a buyer guarantee.

History
In 2011, Ticket Liquidator launched a blog called Live Toast, which includes news in the live entertainment world, reviews of music and theatre shows, opinion pieces, and other content. Its mascot, Toastie, is a talking, anthropomorphic piece of toast. In 2012, when Hurricane Sandy benefit concert tickets were being resold on the secondary market, Ticket Liquidator was one of the sites that refused to list the tickets.

See also
 Ticket resale

References

External links
 Official Website
 Live Toast blog

Ticket sales companies